Manika is a sub-district  of Latehar, Jharkhand, India. '''

References

Latehar district